Aruba competed at the 2020 Summer Paralympics in Tokyo, Japan, from 24 August to 5 September 2021. This was their second consecutive appearance at the Summer Paralympics since 2016.

Competitors
The following is the list of number of competitors participating in the Games:

Taekwondo
DNA: Did not advance | PTF: Win by final score

See also 
 Aruba at the Paralympics
 Aruba at the 2020 Summer Olympics

External links 
 2020 Summer Paralympics website

Nations at the 2020 Summer Paralympics
2020
Summer Paralympics